The Rio Grande Plate is a competition between Tigres and FC Dallas. The winner receives a plate ("Plato Rio Grande") to be awarded each year to the winner of the total aggregate goals difference between the teams in a home-and-away  series.

The plate was created in February 2006 as part of the multi-year partnership with Tigres and FC Dallas.  The plate is named after the Rio Grande. The river, which is known in Mexico as the "Rio Bravo del Norte" ("Bold River of the North"), forms a  continuous border between the U.S. and Mexico.

Winners

FC Dallas
Tigres UANL
Recurring sporting events established in 2006
Recurring sporting events disestablished in 2011